The San Pedro River is a river of Bolivia in  the Chuquisaca Department and in the Potosí Department. It flows to Río Grande.

See also
List of rivers of Bolivia
 Puruma River

References
Rand McNally, The New International Atlas, 1993.

Rivers of Potosí Department
Rivers of Chuquisaca Department